Nizhneye Absalyamovo (Tübänge Äbsäläm) is a rural locality (a village) in Ariyevsky Selsoviet, Duvansky District, Bashkortostan, Russia. The population was 13 as of 2010. There is 1 street.

Geography 
Nizhneye Absalyamovo is located 9 km northwest of Mesyagutovo (the district's administrative centre) by road. Verkhneye Absalyamovo is the nearest rural locality.

References 

Rural localities in Duvansky District